A bylaw enforcement officer (also called municipal law enforcement or municipal enforcement) is an employee of a municipality, county or regional district, charged with the enforcement of local ordinance—bylaws, laws, codes, or regulations enacted by local governments. Bylaw enforcement officers often work closely with police and other law enforcement agencies, but are generally not considered emergency services.

This terminology is commonly used in North America—particularly Canada—and some other Commonwealth countries. In the Canadian province of Ontario, bylaw enforcement officers are generally titled municipal law enforcement officers, and in Newfoundland & Labrador, Alberta and the Northwest Territories, the term municipal enforcement officer is also used. In German speaking countries the term Ordnungsamt, literally translated "Order Office", is widely used. Under other denominations, this kind of bylaw enforcement exists in several countries around the world.

Development of the field

Municipalities are under ever-increasing pressure to provide services efficiently and more cost-effectively; many city governments see bylaw officers as attractive alternatives to police for enforcement of municipal bylaws and less serious issues. Police departments are under increased pressures in everything from staffing and finances, to the requirement to conduct police work within an increasingly complex legal framework brought about by increased litigiousness in society and more onerous limits and guidelines imposed on the police in order to protect individual rights and freedoms. As such, police departments are frequently unable or unwilling to perform duties related to the enforcement of non-criminal statutes or municipal bylaws.

Many cities are finding themselves in situations where the police have stopped performing certain duties which they performed in the past. Failure to regulate certain activities in their municipality then creates problems and generates complaints and public frustration. This commonly results in the relegation of this task to Bylaw Enforcement Officers.

Because the field developed in such an unusual way, essentially to accommodate changes and professionalization of policing, municipal employees of this class began taking on tasks historically performed by police officers, but without any policing powers or protections under the law. Meter maids initially serviced parking meters, which had been a fairly new phenomenon in North American cities of the 1950s. Eventually, as traffic police officers only rarely enforced parking meter regulation, the cities required meter maids to write parking tickets. By the 1970s, most large municipalities had meter maids, who, through the course of the 1980s and the 1990s, transformed into parking enforcement officers and were asked to enforce many more regulations than just those pertaining to meters. In recent history, parking enforcement officers are increasingly taking on other duties, and municipalities are amalgamating specialized enforcement into general duty bylaw enforcement.

Because changes of this sort were unplanned, employees performing various classes of bylaw enforcement (parking, animal control, inspection work) frequently performed a duty of an officer of the law or as a person of authority. Since most bylaw officers were not sworn peace officers (and many are still not), the limits of their authority and exact definition of their powers have occasionally faced challenges.

Many provincial and state laws are being changed to help clarify status of non-constabulary bylaw officers. In British Columbia, when the new enabling charter was amended, (called the Community Charter), sections specifically referring to bylaw officers were included, including the power of bylaw officers to enter upon private property and investigate without warrant, something police are unable to do.  Most provinces have not given local governments the power to allow bylaw officers to trespass without permission, with the exception of BC and Ontario   This power given to allow bylaw officers to intrude on private property and enter residences without any permission or oversight may be on constitutionally infirm ground considering the recent (2019) Supreme court of Canada decision in R v Le which involved Toronto police officers entering a backyard without a warrant or permission, the supreme court declared in its holding with some exceptions police and other peace officers must follow the implied license doctrine which allows police officers and other members of the public (on lawful business) to enter onto private property and approach the door of the residence in order to speak with the owner or occupier.

Many provinces have also standardized training for bylaw enforcement officers. The Alberta Municipal Government Act has no requirements for training of bylaw officers in Alberta. But formal training is available through the Alberta Municipal Enforcement Association and other organizations. If the person is also appointed as a community peace officer then they are required to go through a six-week training program at the Alberta Staff College or complete training that has been approved by the solicitor general's office depending on what provincial acts are being enforced.  The Justice Institute of British Columbia and other private training companies offer specialized courses to those wishing to attain certification in the field in British Columbia.

Sometimes, the enforcement of particular bylaws may be conducted on contract by a private company. Such companies are either highly specialized in a single area of bylaw enforcement (such as animal control in the case of the SPCA), or provide security guards, who are then specially trained to handle specific tasks, usually limited to traffic or parking enforcement. The most recent trend is to recall many of the services previously contracted out and put systems in place to conduct such services in-house. As such, contracting-out is not a great concern in this field.

By jurisdiction

Australia
In Australia, the terms law enforcement officer, shire ranger and local laws officer are used for general-duty bylaw enforcement, traffic officer for parking enforcement only, and animal management officer (formerly known as ranger or council ranger) for animal-related enforcement.

Canada

Structure and organization

Within Canadian jurisdictions, the term bylaw enforcement officer may refer to one or more classes of employees charged with enforcing bylaws, such as animal control officers, parking and traffic enforcement officers, property use inspectors, and building inspectors, but more commonly refers to a person employed in a uniformed capacity for the purpose of enforcing a variety of bylaws in a high-visibility role. Increasingly, municipalities are opting for this model of bylaw enforcement, as a multi-purpose approach to bylaw enforcement is less costly while offering more flexibility. Incumbents to such positions often require a higher degree of skill and experience than those employed in stratified enforcement roles. Many municipalities seek to recruit former or retired police officers to these positions, but the field has undergone significant change in the past several decades, and increased reliance on bylaw officers on the part of the municipal governments has expedited the professionalization of this field. Many police academies and public administration schools offer specialized training in bylaw enforcement.

Types

Most bylaw enforcement services are structured in one of the following ways:

 General Bylaw Enforcement - where the bylaw enforcement officer is responsible for many different bylaws, such as patrol, vehicle parking and stopping regulations, animal control, building and construction, licensing, noise, zoning and business regulation, and management of public recreation areas. Specialized trades inspection is still conducted by a skilled trades inspector with experience in the field, such as a building inspector or an electrical or plumbing inspector. In this capacity, the general Bylaw Enforcement Officer is frequently asked to conduct added duties to respond to a problem. Specialized non-uniform services may be added to assist in enforcement duties where a different image is more productive - such as in the enforcement of business regulations. Some cities employ license inspectors for tasks where a "suit" is more effective than a "badge."
 General Bylaw Enforcement without animal control - where the officers enforce various regulations, but do not conduct animal control, which is assigned to specialized animal control officers or is contracted out to an outside agency such as the SPCA.
 Stratified or diversified bylaw enforcement - where different tasks within bylaw enforcement are handled by different classes of employees. Parking regulations may be enforced by parking enforcement officers, animal regulations by animal control officers, different classes of inspectors may exist for licensing, property use, signage, garbage and waste, environmental protection/recycling, street use or engineering inspectors, etc. This model is usually employed in larger cities, although it is frequently seen as bureaucratic and inefficient, since workloads may not warrant the employment of so many classes of personnel all for specialized tasks.

Peace officer status

It is disputed by experts on whether bylaw officers are peace officers as defined by the Criminal Code of Canada; some lower courts in British Columbia have reached the conclusion that they are, but this has not been affirmed by any higher court in that province or elsewhere in Canada

Today, all bylaw enforcement officers employed in Canada are de facto peace officers; in numerous provinces, bylaw officers are also de jure peace officers for the purpose of enforcing municipal laws, having been sworn under various police acts. Courts have ruled on several occasions, most recently in 2000 (in R. v. Turko), that the definition of peace officer under section 2 of the Criminal Code of Canada includes bylaw officers as "other person[s] employed for the preservation or maintenance of the public peace or for the service or execution of civil process." As such, while actually engaged in the execution of their duties, bylaw enforcement officers are peace officers, independent of whether they are sworn or unsworn constables.

This was first proven in court in 1973, when two men were charged with obstructing a peace officer, in the Yukon Territory Magistrates Court in R. vs Jones and Hubert for their part in removing an impounded dog from an animal control van, contrary to the instructions given to them by an animal control officer of the local municipality. This was the first "peace officer test" before a Canadian federal court to determine whether the definition of peace officer in the Criminal Code of Canada can be extended to bylaw officers, as "other persons employed for the preservation of peace." Justice O'Connor ruled that the animal control officer was in fact a peace officer, under the Criminal Code, but only while in the performance of his duty, and not for the purposes of any activities unrelated to his duties (such as enforcing criminal law). Furthermore, Justice O'Connor highlighted the severity and criminality of obstructing a bylaw officer: "It was submitted [to me] by the defendants that [they should have been charged under a section of the bylaw for hindering the bylaw officer, and not under the Criminal Code]. Having concluded that Mr. Malloy [the bylaw officer] was a peace officer for Criminal Code purposes, and having concluded that the charge under s. 118 of the Criminal Code applies [now sec. 129], I doubt whether s. 13 of the dog bylaw is intra vires of the council of the City of Whitehorse. Obstruction of an animal control officer is a matter of criminal law over which the federal government has legislative jurisdiction. ... In any event it is not for the council of the City of Whitehorse to determine who is a peace officer for the purposes of the Criminal Code. That can only be done by Parliament."

Since then, several other court decisions have reaffirmed this ruling: in Moore v R, the Manitoba County Court held that a poundkeeper was a peace officer within the meaning of section 2 of the Criminal Code. Most recently, in 2000, in R vs Turko, the Provincial Court of British Columbia ruled that Capital Regional District (CRD) bylaw enforcement officers were justified in arresting a person for failing to provide identification while engaged in enforcement of an anti-smoking bylaw, as the latter's refusal to provide identification constituted obstruction of a peace officer (contrary to sec. 129 of the criminal code). "I conclude," Judge Ehrcke wrote in the judgment against Mr. Turko, "based on the duties the officers in this case were exercising that they were peace officers engaged in their duties when they attempted to enforce the bylaw against the accused. They were maintaining and preserving the public peace." Turko was convicted of the obstructing of a peace officer and assault on a peace officer.

Not only did the Turko decision confirm that bylaw officers were peace officers within the meaning of the Criminal Code, but it held that a bylaw officer had the powers to detain or arrest a person for failing to identify themselves according to section 129.

This was further upheld in Woodward v. Capital Regional District et al. (2005), where two bylaw officers used force, including batons, to arrest a person for obstruction. Judge M. Hubbard ruled that bylaw officers were justified in arresting a person for failing to provide identification, and in so doing, using whatever reasonable force was necessary to subdue a person.

In Alberta, section 555(1) of the Municipal Government Act states that "A person who is appointed as a bylaw enforcement officer is, in the execution of enforcement duties, responsible for the preservation and maintenance of the public peace".

Section 15(2) of Ontario's Police Services Act R.S.O. 1990, states "Municipal law enforcement officers are peace officers for the purpose of enforcing municipal by-laws." Similar sections exist in most provincial police acts.

For bylaw officers, this means that those persons who may be employed as bylaw officers without having been sworn under provincial acts are nonetheless protected under the criminal code definition of peace officer. This has somewhat convoluted the process of legally appointing bylaw officers. In British Columbia, for example, a person may be appointed as a bylaw officer through the Community Charter, which sets out different powers and responsibilities the Province of BC delegates to municipalities. However, the Provincial Police Act, which sets out various rules pertaining to police structure and administration in BC, also provides a mechanism for appointing bylaw officers.

It may be a criminal offence of obstruction of justice for a person to provide a false name or fail to provide their name to a bylaw officer if they are to be issued a bylaw ticket as was found by a provincial court judge in British Columbia in which the suspect also physically resisted so this case law may be limited to a certain set of circumstances as occurred in that case. the charter of rights protects the right to remain silent, and any obligation to ID is limited to providing a name and date of birth, there is no law anywhere in Canada that requires civilians to carry or produce photo ID on request to police or bylaw officers unless they are operating a motor vehicle Conversely, this doesn't apply to being asked to identify yourself by a peace officer; failure to prove identity is an arrestable offence, and will result in detainment.

However, how far the peace officer status extends to bylaw officers in other contexts is unclear. Some municipalities now use bylaw officers to stop and inspect commercial vehicles and even for non-criminal enforcement of marijuana grow operations. However, although it is clear that sections on obstruction and assault (for their own protection) apply to bylaw officers, it is unclear to what extent other peace officer powers apply to bylaw officers, particularly in cases where the bylaw officer gives direction to party that disobeys (i.e. the bylaw officer attempts to pull over a vehicle which intentionally fails to stop or gives lawful instructions to someone who then disobeys that instruction). It is also unclear to what extent peace officer status applies to non-proprietary (contract) employees, such as those employed by a security company on contract to a municipality.

Alberta
In the Canadian province of Alberta, municipalities can appoint bylaw enforcement officers under the authority of section 555 and 556 of the Municipal Government Act. There is a common misconception that all bylaw officers are community peace officers. However, a person appointed as a community peace officer can only enforce provincial acts and regulations. A community peace officer is not authorized to enforce municipal bylaws unless they are also appointed under the authority of the Municipal Government Act, or if the specific bylaw states it can be enforced by a community peace officer working for that municipality. There are a number of municipalities in Alberta whose officers enforce only municipal bylaws as bylaw officers, others that only enforce provincial acts as community peace officers, and others that hold dual municipal and provincial appointments.

China 

In the mainland of the People's Republic of China (PRC) every city established a so-called Urban Administrative and Law Enforcement Bureau, commonly abbreviated to Chengguan as a local government agency for bylaw enforcement duties.

The Chengguan is part of a city or municipality's Urban Management Bureau. The agency enforces local bylaws, city appearance bylaws, environment, sanitation, work safety, pollution control, health, and can involve enforcement in planning, greening, industry and commerce, environment protection, municipal affairs and water in large cities.

Germany
In Germany order enforcement offices are established under the state's laws and local regulations under different terms like Ordnungsamt (order enforcement office), Ordnungsdienst (order enforcement service), Gemeindevollzugsdienst (municipal code enforcement office) or Polizeibehörde (police authority). Beside this some German communities implemented Stadtpolizei (city police) forces for general-duty law enforcement. Currently there are no general regulations or standards for the training, there are different responsibilities and powers. The equipment and uniforms differ from town to town, some carry weapons and wear police-like or police uniforms, others just wear labeled jackets over plain clothes. Most of the order enforcement offices are established by the municipalities, but can be established by the rural districts for their area of competence as well.

The Netherlands 
In the Netherlands, this service is called Handhaving (Dutch for "Enforcement") or Handhaving en Toezicht (Dutch for "Enforcement and Surveillance"), and the police-like uniforms carry this inscription in most cities as well. The officials of these municipal authorities actively address people who are against the city regulations and are present in public places. The responsibilities of Handhaving include:
 drug harassment or alcohol abuse
 review of prostitution permits, detection of abuses such as human trafficking
 increasing objective and subjective security in public spaces and public transport
 the towing of dangerously parked vehicles

New Zealand
In New Zealand, local governments such as district/city councils usually appoint persons to undertake certain enforcement duties. Councils can employ persons such as: Enforcement Officers, Animal Control Officers, Parking Officers, Noise Control Officers, and Litter Officers. These positions are granted role-specific powers under legislation. Common parts of their roles include enforcing bylaws made by the local council, such as dog-leash rules or parking restrictions during special events. Abuse against these government employees is commonplace and safety measures have started to take effect, such as body-worn cameras.

United States
Municipalities in the United States more frequently use the terms code enforcement officer or municipal regulations officer, although code enforcement officers in the United States often have a narrower scope of duties than municipal bylaw enforcement officers in Canada. Code enforcement officers in the United States are more like property standards officers in Canada.

United Kingdom
In the United Kingdom, the word warden is commonly used to describe various classes of non-police enforcement officers, and sometimes the title of inspector is also used in various jurisdictions. An environmental warden in Edinburgh, Scotland, has duties very similar to those of  a bylaw enforcement officer employed by a similar-sized city in Canada.

See also
 Nuisance abatement
 Traffic warden
 Traffic guard
 Traffic police
 Highway patrol
 State police
 Car guard
 Municipal police

References

External links

Canada
 ONTARIO ASSOCIATION of PROPERTY STANDARD OFFICERS -OAPSO
 Municipal Law Enforcement Officers Association of Ontario
 Licence Inspectors & Bylaw Officers' Association of British Columbia
 Pointe-Claire Public security
 Outremont Public Security
 Île Bizard Public Security (french)
 City of Moncton by-law enforcement
 Montréal Taxi Bureau (Enforcement Division)
 Montréal Mobility Squad (Enforcement Division)

United States
 California Association of Code Enforcement Officers
 American Association of Code Enforcement

Australia
 West Australian Rangers Association

Law enforcement occupations
Law enforcement